WFHS-FM (92.7 The Tiger FM) is a radio station licensed to broadcast from Louisville, Kentucky's Fern Creek neighborhood. The station is owned by Fern Creek Traditional High School Alumni Association, Inc. 92.7 The Tiger is a student-run radio station that is licensed to play all genres of music such as rock and country and broadcasts Fern Creek High School's football and basketball games.

References

External links
 

FHS-LP
High school radio stations in the United States
FHS-LP